Lake Banksiadale is a man-made reservoir located in the Peel region of Western Australia. Since 1971 it has been the site of the South Dandalup Dam, the largest dam supplying water to Perth, Western Australia's capital city.

The reservoir's proximity to Dwellingup makes it a popular recreation area.  Western Australia's Water Corporation manages the area, and has provided facilities including picnic areas with gas barbecues, and a number of walk trails.

References

Banksiadale, Lake
Darling Range
Shire of Murray